A testicle festival is an event held at several small towns where the featured activity is the consumption of animal testicles, usually battered and fried.

The oldest of such festivals takes place in Byron, Illinois, US, and features turkey testicles. Similar festivals in the US are held in Deerfield, Michigan; Olean, Missouri; Tiro, Ohio; Oakdale, California; Ashland, Nebraska; Huntley, Illinois; Stillwater, Oklahoma; Salmon, Idaho; Clinton, Montana; Dundas, Wisconsin, and Bentonville, Arkansas, some of which feature Rocky mountain oysters (cattle testicles). 
The Montana State Society has held an annual Rocky Mountain Oyster Festival in Clinton, Montana, since 2005.

Every year in September the villages of Ozrem and Lunjevica in the municipality of Gornji Milanovac, Serbia, host the World Gonad Cooking Championship. The festival serves up a variety of testicles, including wildlife. It also gives awards for "ballsy" newsmakers. U.S. President Barack Obama and pilot Chesley Sullenberger won awards in 2010.

See also
 Testicles as food

References

External links
 Oakdalecowboymuseum.org
 Bentonville Testicle Festival

Food and drink festivals in the United States
Testicle
Food and drink festivals in Serbia